Yusuf Özdemir (born 10 January 2001) is a Turkish professional footballer. He currently plays as a midfielder for Alanyaspor.

Professional career
Özdemir is a product of the youth academies of Güngörenspor and Alanyaspor. He signed his first professional contract with Alanyaspor in 2020. He made his professional debut with Alanyaspor in a 1–0 Süper Lig win over MKE Ankaragücü on 15 May 2021. On 27 January 2022, he joined İnegölspor on loan for the second half of the 2021-22 season.

Playing style
Özdemir is a versatile player that usually plays as a left midfielder, but can also play as left-back or winger. He helps in both offense and defense, and is an energetic and eager player.

References

External links

2001 births
Living people
People from Bahçelievler, Istanbul
Footballers from Istanbul
Turkish footballers
Alanyaspor footballers
İnegölspor footballers
Süper Lig players
TFF Second League players
Association football midfielders